= Las Parinas =

Coordinates: 26.5000°S 68.0981°W

Las Parinas is a geological and cultural region in northwestern Argentina, consisting of unique volcanic geomorphology as well as a long human settlement history. Today the region is an important center of animal husbandry, where primarily llama and sheep are raised for their wool to be used as textile products. The region has been submitted by its government to the UNESCO World Heritage Tentative List for its purported universal natural and cultural value.

== World Heritage Status ==
This site was added to the UNESCO World Heritage Tentative List on November 15, 2001 in the Mixed (Cultural + Natural) category.
